Colina pinguis is a species of sea snail, a marine gastropod mollusk in the family Cerithiidae.

There is one subspecies: Colina pinguis madagascariensis Bozzetti, 2008

Description

Distribution

References

 Jousseaume F. (1931 ["1930"]) Cerithiidae de la Mer Rouge. Journal de Conchyliologie 74(4): 270–296. [Posthumous work edited by E. Lamy; Published 9 February 1931]
 Houbrick R.S. (1990) Review of the genus Colina H. and A. Adams, 1854 (Cerithiidae: Prosobranchia). The Nautilus 104(2): 35–52. [6 September 1990]

External links

Cerithiidae
Gastropods described in 1855